Edmund Stone (c. 1700 – c. 1768) was an autodidact mathematician from Scotland in the 18th century.

Life and work 

Practically nothing is known about the life of Edmund Stone. He was the son of the gardener of John Campbell, 2nd Duke of Argyll. He learned reading, Latin, French and mathematics by himself. According to his contemporary Andrew Michael Ramsay, the Duke found a copy of Newton's Principia in the grass in his garden, and was astonished to find it belonged to the 18 year old Stone. The Duke became his patron.

Under the Duke's protection, Stone arrived in London in 1723 and published his first book: Treatise on Mathematical Instruments. In 1725 he was elected a Fellow of the Royal Society.

In the following years he published some papers in the Philosophical Transactions. His book A New Mathematical Dictionary appeared in 1726, and was drawn in part from the Latin versions of the German philosopher Christian Wolff's mathematical works.

He also published a translation into English of Euclid's Elements (London: 1728) and The Method of Fluxions, both Direct and Inverse (London: 1730). The first part of the Method of Fluxions is a translation of the book by L'Hôpital. Stone translated Isaac Barrow's Geometrical Lectures (London: 1735) from Lectiones Opticae et Geometricae (1669) which had originally been revised, corrected, and amended in Latin by Sir Isaac Newton.

From 1743, the death of the Duke, he seems to have lived in absolute poverty.

References

Further reading

External links 
 
 

1700 births
1768 deaths
18th-century Scottish people
18th-century Scottish mathematicians
Fellows of the Royal Society